Rolf Dieter Brinkmann (16 April 1940 – 23 April 1975) was a German writer of poems, short stories, a novel, essays, letters, and diaries.

Life and work
Rolf Dieter Brinkmann is considered an important forerunner of the German so-called Pop-Literatur. He published nine books of poems in the 1960s, dealing with the appearance of the present culture and the sensual experience of active subjectivity. During that period he also wrote Keiner weiß mehr (Nobody knows anymore), a novel of modern family life. His early prose was inspired by the French nouveau roman. The precision of description of this style never left him, but merged in his poetry with influences from Gottfried Benn and William Carlos Williams, Frank O'Hara, and Ted Berrigan. In 1972/73 Brinkmann was a recipient of a fellowship at the German Academy Villa Massimo in Rome. His sensibility and the despair of civilisation permeating Rom, Blicke and the other posthumously published prose writings goes deep. The spring of 1974 he was a visiting lecturer at the German Department of University of Texas at Austin. He was posthumously awarded the Petrarca-Preis in 1975 for his major and highly praised and influential last book of poetry Westwärts 1 & 2 (1975). In 2005 a new expanded edition of this book was published with 26 longer poems finally added as well as a 75 pages long postscript by the author. These parts were reluctantly excluded from the first edition by Brinkmann as the publisher thought the book was too extensive. After a couple of readings at Cambridge Poetry Festival some weeks before the publication of Westwärts 1 & 2, he was instantly killed in a hit-and-run-accident in central London.

Selected works
 vorstellung meiner hände (2010) 
Briefe an Hartmut 1974–1975 (1999) 
Schnitte. (1988) 
Erkundungen für die Präzisierung des Gefühls für einen Aufstand : Träume, Aufstände, Gewalt, Morde : Reise, Zeit, Magazin : die Story ist schnell erzählt (Tagebuch) (1987) 
Erzählungen (1985) 
Der Film in Worten : Prosa, Erzählungen, Essays, Hörspiele, Fotos, Collagen, 1965–1974 (1982) 
Standphotos. Gedichte 1962–1970 (1980) 
Rom, Blicke. (1979) 
Westwärts 1 & 2. (1975)   (pbk.)
Keiner weiß mehr. (1968)

English translations
Like a Pilot: Rolf Dieter Brinkmann, Selected Poems, 1963–1970; translated by Mark Terrill (Sulphur River Literary Review Press, 2001) 
 Some Very Popular Songs, one long poem from Westwärts 1 & 2, translated by Mark Terrill (Toad Press, 2010).
 Under Glass, a foldout broadsheet of 13 poems, translated by Mark Terrill (Longhouse, 2010).
 An Unchanging Blue, Selected Poems 1962–1975, trans. Mark Terrill (Parlor Press, 2011), 222 p. 
 Long poem Some Very Popular Songs, trans. Mark Terrill, published in B O D Y

Bibliography
John MacKay, Inscription and Modernity: From Wordsworth to Mandelstam (Bloomington: Indiana University Press, 2006), esp. pp. 28– 34.

References
 Heinz Ludwig Arnold (ed.), Zeitschrift Text+Kritik, Themenheft: Rolf Dieter Brinkmann. Nr. 71, 1981,  Index of contents With an annotated selected bibliography.
 Johann Reißer: Archäologie und Sampling – Die Neuordnung der Lyrik bei Rolf Dieter Brinkmann, Thomas Kling und Barbara Köhler. Kulturverlag Kadmos, Berlin 2014, .
 Thomas Boyken, Ina Cappelmann und Uwe Schwagmeier (Hrsg.): Rolf Dieter Brinkmann: Neue Perspektiven. Orte, Helden, Körper. Fink, München 2010, .
 Theo Breuer: Was Neues im Westen oder Brinkmann macht weiter. In: Aus dem Hinterland. Lyrik nach 2000. Edition YE, Sistig 2005.
 Maleen Brinkmann: R. D. Brinkmann. Literaturmagazin 36. Rowohlt, Reinbek 1995, .
 Karl-Eckhard Carius (ed.): Brinkmann. Schnitte im Atemschutz. edition text + kritik, München 2008.
 Roberto Di Bella: ‚... das wildgefleckte Panorama eines anderen Traums‘. Rolf Dieter Brinkmanns spätes Romanprojekt. Königshausen & Neumann, Würzburg 2015, . 
 Otto Dörner: Rolf Dieter Brinkmann – Der Dichter aus Vechta. In: Jahrbuch für das Oldenburger Münsterland 1987. Vechta 1986, S. 322–340. 
 Gunter Geduldig, Ursula Schüssler (eds.): /:Vechta! Eine Fiktion!/: der Dichter Rolf Dieter Brinkmann. Secolo, Osnabrück 1995.
 id. (ed. with Claudia Wehebrink): Bibliographie R. D. Brinkmann. Aisthesis, Bielefeld 1997.
 id. (ed.): Amerikanischer Speck, englischer Honig, italienische Nüsse. Rolf Dieter Brinkmann zum 60. Eiswasser. Zeitschrift für Literatur, 7. Jahrgang, 2 Bände, Eiswasser Verlag 2000.
 ders. und Marco Sagurna (eds.): Too much. Das lange Leben des Rolf Dieter Brinkmann. 2. ed. Eiswasser, Vechta 2000. – Collection of interviews with friends, scholars and writers.
Oliver Kobold: Lange nachdenkliche Gänge. Rolf Dieter Brinkmanns Lyrik und Prosa 1959–1962. Universitätsverlag WINTER, Heidelberg 2014.
 Andreas Moll: Text und Bild bei Rolf Dieter Brinkmann. Intermedialität im Spätwerk. Peter Lang, Frankfurt am Main 2006.
 Hansjürgen Richter: Ästhetik der Ambivalenz. Studien zur Struktur „postmoderner“ Lyrik, exemplarisch dargestellt an Rolf Dieter Brinkmanns Poetik und dem Gedichtband „Westwärts 1 & 2“.' Peter Lang, Frankfurt am Main 1983.
 Jan Röhnert, Gunter Geduldig (eds.): Rolf Dieter Brinkmann. Seine Gedichte in Einzelinterpretationen. 2 vols., Walter de Gruyter, Berlin 2012, .
 Jörgen Schäfer: Pop-Literatur. Rolf Dieter Brinkmann und das Verhältnis zur Populärkultur in der Literatur der sechziger Jahre. M & P Verlag für Wissenschaft und Forschung, Stuttgart 1998.
 Stephanie Schmitt: Intermedialität bei Rolf Dieter Brinkmann. Konstruktionen von Gegenwart an den Schnittstellen von Text, Bild und Musik. transcript, Bielefeld 2012, .
 Udo Seinsoth: Katalog Nr. 20. Bibliografie der Veröffentlichungen. Antiquariat Beim Steinernen Kreuz (Hrsg.): Rolf Dieter Brinkmann zum 50. Geburtstag. Eigenverlag, Bremen 1990, S. 38–57.
 Oscar Sundara: Rolf Dieter Brinkmann (Serv, 2011, in English) 
 Ingo Sundmacher: Brinkmann meets Burroughs. Literatur und intermediale Postmoderne. In: Z. Zeitschrift für Kultur- und Geisteswissenschaften.'' H. 16, 1998. Fösse, Hannover  S. 3–16.

External links
 Short biography
 www.brinkmann-wildgefleckt.de, Internet page to the monograph of Roberto Di Bella (see references): updates and materials to the work of Rolf Dieter Brinkmann and its reception.
 Reviews by Thomas Groß of recordings released in 2005. signandsight.com
 Review by Stephan Delbos of the bilingual volume An Unchanging Blue (2011). The Prague Post
 Short interview with Brinkmann's translator Mark Terrill (2011). The Prague Post

1940 births
1975 deaths
People from Vechta
People from Oldenburg (state)
20th-century German poets
German male poets
German-language poets
20th-century German male writers
Road incident deaths in London